Sweden was represented in the Eurovision Song Contest 2005 by Martin Stenmarck with the song "Las Vegas".

Before Eurovision

Melodifestivalen 2005 

The entrant was chosen through the Swedish national final Melodifestivalen. Four heats and one "second chance" round were broadcast to decide the line-up for the national final in Sweden. As in recent years the qualifying heats were held across Sweden. The Melodifestival started out in Göteborg and travelled through Linköping, Skellefteå, and Växjö before the final. The final was won by Martin Stenmarck with his song "Las Vegas", which was written and composed by Niklas Edberger, Johan Fransson, Tim Larsson and Tobias Lundgren. Nanne, who was the favourite of televoters, came second, as she did not receive enough points from the 11 juries. This caused much controversy in Sweden.

Heats and Second Chance round 

 The first heat took place on 21 February 2005 and was presented by Alexandra Pascalidou and Shan Atci. "Att älska dig" performed by Shirley Clamp and "Ödet var min väg" performed by Nordman qualified directly to the final, while "Alla flickor" performed by Linda Bengtzing and "Alcastar" performed by Alcazar advanced to the Second Chance round. "Var mig nära" performed by Cecilia Vennersten, "My Number One" performed by Papa Dee, "Invisible People" performed by The Wallstones, and "Refrain, Refrain" performed by Pay TV were eliminated from the contest.
 The second heat took place on 28 February 2005 and was presented by Erik Haag and Henrik Schyffert. "Higher Ground" performed by Sanne Salomonsen and "Du och jag mot världen" performed by Fredrik Kempe and Sanna Nielsen qualified directly to the final, while "Med hjärtats egna ord" performed by Josefin Nilsson and "Roma" performed by Cameron Cartio advanced to the Second Chance round. "Jenny" performed by Camilla Brinck, "Big Up" performed by Group Avalon, "Vad du än trodde så trodde du fel" performed by Arja Saijonmaa, and "Gone" performed by Bodies Without Organs were eliminated from the contest.
 The third heat took place on 6 March 2005 and was presented by Johanna Westman and Markoolio. "Las Vegas" performed by Martin Stenmarck and "Vi kan gunga" performed by Jimmy Jansson qualified directly to the final, while "Wherever You Go" performed by Nana and "Nothing at All" performed by LaGaylia Frazier advanced to the Second Chance round. "Lovin' Your Feen" performed by Kwanzaa, "Rain" performed by Josef, "We Got It All" performed by K2 feat. Alannah Myles, and "Om natten" performed by Jessica Folcker were eliminated from the contest.
 The fourth heat took place on 13 March 2005 and was presented by Kayo Shekoni and Michael Leijnegard. "Håll om mig" performed by Nanne Grönvall and "A Different Kind of Love" performed by Caroline Wennergren qualified directly to the final, while "As If Tomorrow Will Never Come" performed by Katrina and the Nameless and "Långt bortom tid och rum" performed by Mathias Holmgren advanced to the Second Chance round. "Så nära" performed by Anne-Lie Rydé, "One Step Closer" performed by B-Boys International feat. Paul M, "Ready for Me" performed by Rickard Engfors feat. Katarina Fallholm, and "Hörde änglarna viska ditt namn" performed by Date were eliminated from the contest.
 The Second Chance round (Andra chansen) took place on 14 March 2005 and was presented by Annika Jankell. "Alcastar" performed by Alcazar and "Alla flickor" performed by Linda Bengtzing qualified to the final.

Final 
The final took place on 20 March 2005 at the Globe Arena in Stockholm and was presented by Jill Johnson and Mark Levengood.

At Eurovision
Martin automatically qualified for the Kyiv final (thanks to Lena Philipsson's 5th place result in the 2004 Contest), where he performed 14th. The result was a joint 19th place (out of 24) with 30 points; this was the lowest placement for Sweden in 13 years.

The spokesperson who revealed Sweden's votes for other countries was SVT and radio host Annika Jankell.

Voting

Points awarded to Sweden

Points awarded by Sweden

References

2005
Countries in the Eurovision Song Contest 2005
Eurovision
Eurovision